Fotis Papadopoulos (born 5 December 1975) is a retired Greek football midfielder.

References

1975 births
Living people
Greek footballers
Iraklis Thessaloniki F.C. players
ILTEX Lykoi F.C. players
Nafpaktiakos Asteras F.C. players
Anagennisi Karditsa F.C. players
Panionios F.C. players
Panachaiki F.C. players
Patraikos F.C. players
Paniliakos F.C. players
Veria F.C. players
Agrotikos Asteras F.C. players
Olympiacos Volos F.C. players
Thermaikos F.C. players
Super League Greece players
Association football midfielders